The 2013–14 Texas–Arlington Mavericks women's basketball team represented the University of Texas at Arlington during the 2013–14 NCAA Division I women's basketball season. The Mavericks, led by first year head coach Krista Gerlich, play their home games at the College Park Center as first year members of the Sun Belt Conference.

Roster

Schedule

|-
!colspan=9| Regular Season

See also
2013–14 Texas–Arlington Mavericks men's basketball team

References

UT Arlington Mavericks women's basketball seasons
Texas-Arlington
Texas-Arlington Mavericks basketball
Texas-Arlington Mavericks basketball